The rainy season is the time of year when most of a region's average annual rainfall occurs.

Rainy Season may also refer to:
 Rainy Season (short story), a 1989 short horror story by Stephen King
 "Rainy Season", a 2018 song by Monni
 The Rainy Season, a 1993 album by Marc Cohn
 The Rainy Season, a 1999 novel by James Blaylock
 Rainy Seasons (film), a 2010 Iranian film